The 2003 Winter Universiade, the XXI Winter Universiade, took place in Tarvisio, Italy. Total 1,266 athletes from 41 countries performed at the Tarvisio 2003 Winter Universiade in Italy.

Venues

Tarvisio 
 Alpine skiing
 Cross-country skiing
 Nordic combined
 Ski jumping

Another Venues 
 Forni Avoltri - Biathlon
 Claut - Curling
 Piancavallo - Figure skating, short track, snowboard
 Pontebba - Ice hockey
 Zoncolan - Carving
 Villach  - Ice hockey
 Bischofshofen  - Ski jumping

Medal table

Sports
 Curling
 Figure skating

 
2003
Winter Universiade
U
Winter Universiade
Multi-sport events in Italy
Sport in Friuli-Venezia Giulia
Winter Universiade
Winter sports competitions in Italy